O'Hearn is an English/Irish surname. As an English surname, it can derive firstly from an early medieval nickname for someone thought to resemble the Heron bird. Notable people with the surname include:

 Ed O'Hearn (1898–unknown), American professional football player
 George E. O'Hearn, American college football coach
 John O'Hearn (1893–1977), American professional football player
 Kevin O'Hearn (born  1963), American politician
 Melinda O'Hearn (alias Midajah; born 1973), American actress, singer and fitness model
 Michael O'Hearn (born 1969), American bodybuilder
 Patrick O'Hearn (born 1954), American multi-instrumentalist musician, composer and recording artist
 Peter O'Hearn (born 1963), British-Canadian computer scientist
 Ryan O'Hearn (born 1993), American baseball player
 Taylor W. O'Hearn (1907–1997), American politician from Louisiana
 Walter O'Hearn (1890–1950), Australian politician
 Walter D. O'Hearn (1910–1970?), prominent Canadian journalist in the mid-20th century
 Zooko Wilcox-O'Hearn (born Bryce Wilcox-O'Hearn), American computer hacker and cypherpunk

References